When I Fall in Love is the seventh studio album by trumpet player Chris Botti. It was released by Columbia Records on September 28, 2004 and peaked at number 1 on Billboard Top Jazz Albums chart. The album has sold more than 500,000 copies and has been certified Gold by the Recording Industry Association of America (RIAA).

Track listing

Personnel 
 Chris Botti – trumpet (1-13), vocals (2)
 Federico Gonzalez Peña – acoustic piano (1)
 Greg Phillinganes – acoustic piano (2, 10)
 Billy Childs – acoustic piano (3, 6, 8, 9, 11, 12), Fender Rhodes (5), arrangements (5, 9, 12)
 Jeff Lorber – keyboards (3), arrangements (3)
 Shane Fontayne – guitar (1, 2)
 Dean Parks – guitar (3, 6, 8, 9, 11)
 Mitch Dalton – semi-acoustic jazz guitar (7)
 Dominic Miller – guitar (8)
 Jon Ossman – bass (1)
 Brian Bromberg – bass (2, 3, 5, 6, 8-11), arrangements (3)
 Alec Dankworth – double bass (7)
 Billy Kilson – drums (1, 6, 11)
 Vinnie Colaiuta – drums (2, 3, 5, 8, 9, 10)
 Ralph Salmins – drums (7)
 Paulinho da Costa – percussion (1, 5, 6, 8, 11)
 Bob Sheppard – saxophone (3)
 Marc Shulman – arrangements (1)
 Gil Goldstein – orchestra arrangements (1)
 Bobby Colomby – arrangements (3)
 Mike Anthony – vocal arrangements (3)
 Jeremy Lubbock – arrangements (4, 7, 10, 13)
 Paula Cole – vocals (2, 10)
 Jill Zadeh – vocals (3)
 Sting – vocals (8)

The London Session Orchestra (Tracks 1, 2 & 4-13)
 Isobel Griffiths – orchestra contractor
 Mitch Dalton – semi-acoustic jazz guitar, acoustic guitar 
 Ralph Salmins – drums

Brass and Woodwinds 
 Nigel Hitchcock – alto saxophone 
 Jamie Talbot – tenor saxophone, bass clarinet 
 Anthony Pike and Nick Rodwell – clarinet 
 Jane Marshall – cor anglais
 Helen Keen, Karen Jones, Stan Sulzmann and Phil Todd – alto flute, flute 
 Andy Panayi – bass flute 
 David Theodore – oboe
 Richard Bissill, David Pyatt and Michael Thompson – French horn 
 Dave Stewart – bass trombone, euphonium
 Pete Beachill, Richard Edwards and Mark Nightingale – trombone, tenor trombone 
 John Barclay, Guy Barker and Derek Watkins – trumpet, flugelhorn

Strings
 Dave Daniels, Caroline Dearnley, Paul Kegg, Anthony Lewis, Anthony Pleeth and Frank Schaefer – cello 
 Alec Dankworth, Patrick Lannigan, Chris Laurence and Mary Scully – double bass 
 Fiona Hibbert – harp
 Peter Lale, George Robertson, Edward Vanderspar, Ivo Van Der Werff, Vicci Wardman and Bruce White – viola 
 Thomas Bowes, Jonathan Evans-Jones, Roger Garland (2nd leader), Patrick Kiernan, Boguslaw Kostecki, Julian Leaper, Rita Manning, Steve Morris, Maciej Rakowski, Jackie Shave, Kenneth Sillito (1st leader), Cathy Thompson, Debbie Widdup, Paul Willey, Rolf Wilson (1st leader) and David Woodcock – violin

Production 
 Bobby Colomby – producer (1, 2, 4-13)
 Brian Bromberg – producer (3)
 Jeff Lorber – producer (3), engineer (3)
 Sean Douglas – associate producer 
 Al Schmitt – engineer (1-7, 9-12), mixing 
 Steve Genewick – assistant engineer (1-7, 9-12), Pro Tools operator (1-7, 9-12)
 Elliot Scheiner – engineer (8)
 Brian Montgomery – assistant engineer (8), Pro Tools operator (8)
 Haydn Bendall – orchestra engineer (1, 2, 4-13)
 Chris Barrett – assistant orchestra engineer (1, 2, 4-13), Pro Tools operator
 Robert Hadley – mastering 
 Doug Sax – mastering
 Mary Maurer – art direction, design
 Jill Gifford – design assistant 
 Fabrizio Ferri – photography 
 Marc Silag – management

 Studios 
 Recorded at Capitol Studios (Hollywood, CA); JHL Sound (Pacific Palisades, CA); Avatar Studios (New York, NY).
 Orchestra recorded at AIR Lyndhurst Hall (London, UK).
 Mixed at Capitol Studios.
 Mastered at The Mastering Lab (Hollywood, CA).

Charts

Weekly charts

Year-end charts

Certifications

References

Chris Botti albums
2004 albums
Columbia Records albums
Instrumental albums
Albums produced by Bobby Colomby
Albums recorded at AIR Studios